Pumpkin spider may refer to:

 Araneus diadematus, also called the cross spider
 Araneus marmoreus, also called the marbled orb-weaver

Set index articles on spiders